The 1965 California Golden Bears football team was an American football team that represented the University of California, Berkeley in the Athletic Association of Western Universities (AAWU) during the 1965 NCAA University Division football season. In their second year under head coach Ray Willsey, the Golden Bears compiled a 5–5 record (2–3 against AAWU opponents), finished in a tie for fifth place in the AAWU, and was outscored by its opponents by a combined total of 194 to 125.

The team's statistical leaders included Jim Hunt with 383 passing yards, Tom Relles with 485 rushing yards, and Jerry Bradley with 360 receiving yards.

Schedule

References

California
California Golden Bears football seasons
California Golden Bears football